Fox Creek Pass is a pedestrian mountain pass located in the Teton Range, Grand Teton National Park, in the U.S. state of Wyoming. Fox Creek Pass can be accessed by way of the Teton Crest Trail or the Death Canyon Trail from the east. To the north lies the Death Canyon Shelf in Grand Teton National Park while Fossil Mountain and Caribou-Targhee National Forest are to the west and south, respectively.

References

Mountain passes of Wyoming
Mountain passes of Teton County, Wyoming